The Venerable  William Palin  (1893 - 1967) was Archdeacon of Cleveland from 1947 until 1965.

Palin was educated at Hertford College, Oxford; and ordained in 1923. After a curacy at North Ormesby he was Vicar of Thornaby-on-Tees from 1928 to 1938. He was a Chaplain in the RAF from 1936 to 1938; then  Vicar of St. John, Middlesbrough from 1938 to 1947 (and  Rural Dean of Middlesbrough). He was Rector of Skelton-in-Cleveland with of Upleatham from 1947 to 1965.

He died on 1 May 1967.

References

1893 births
People from the East Riding of Yorkshire
Alumni of Hertford College, Oxford
Archdeacons of Cleveland
1974 deaths
Royal Air Force chaplains
Clergy from Yorkshire